The Andaman rat (Rattus stoicus) is a species of rodent in the family Muridae. It is endemic to the Andaman Islands, where it has been recorded on Henry Lawrence Island, South Andaman, and Middle Andaman.

References

Rattus
Rats of Asia
Endemic fauna of the Andaman Islands
Rodents of India
Mammals described in 1902
Taxa named by Gerrit Smith Miller Jr.
Taxonomy articles created by Polbot